On 22 October 1709, during the Great Northern War, the alliance between the Russian Empire and Denmark-Norway was renewed in the Treaty of Copenhagen. Charles XII of Sweden had destroyed the previous alliance in Travendal (1700). For Russia, Vasily Lukich Dolgorukov signed the treaty in Copenhagen.

See also
Treaty of Copenhagen (disambiguation), for other treaties known by this name

Sources

External links
Scan of the treaty at IEG Mainz

Copenhagen
1709 treaties
1709 in Denmark
1700s in Poland
Treaties of the Russian Empire
Treaties of Denmark–Norway
Bilateral treaties of Russia